Alessandro Morbidelli (born May 2, 1966) is an Italian astronomer and planetary scientist who is currently employed by the Observatoire de la Cote d'Azur in Nice.

Morbidelli specialises in Solar System dynamics, especially planetary formation and migration and the structure of the asteroid and Kuiper belts.

In 2000, he received the Urey Prize from the Division for Planetary Sciences of the American Astronomical Society.

On 17 November 2015, Morbidelli was elected a foreign member of the French Académie des Sciences. 

In 2018, he received the Prix Jules Janssen, the highest award of the Société astronomique de France.

Publications
 Jewitt D., Morbidelli A., Rauer H., "Trans-Neptunian Objects and Comets", Springer, 2008

References

External links
 Talk of Alessandro Morbidelli at the Origins 2011 congress

21st-century Italian astronomers
Members of the French Academy of Sciences
1966 births
Living people

Planetary scientists